Arealva is a city in the state of São Paulo in Brazil. The population is 8,613 (2020 est.) in an area of 505 km². The elevation is 445 m.

The Bauru-Arealva Airport (official name Moussa Nakhl Tobias State Airport) located at Arealva also serves the adjoining city of Bauru.

References

Municipalities in São Paulo (state)